Events from the year 1956 in Denmark.

Incumbents
 Monarch – Frederick IX
 Prime minister – H. C. Hansen

Events

Sports

Badminton
 17 March  Finn Kobberø and Jørgen Hammergaard Hansen win gold in Men's Double at the  All England Badminton Championships

Cycling
 	27 Augustus - 2 September  The 1956 UCI Track Cycling World Championships  are held in Copenhagen.

Football
 2 June  BK Frem wins the 1955–56 Danish Cup by defeating AB 10 in the final.

Date unknown
 Dominique Forlini (FRA) and Georges Senfftleben (FRA) win the Six Days of Copenhagen sox-day track cycling race.
  Lucien Gillen (LUX) and Gerrit Schulte (NED) win the Six Days of Copenhagen sox-day track cycling race.

Births
 13 March – John Frandsen, composer
 30 September – Frank Arnesen, football player and manager
 29 November – Lene Tranberg, architect and co-founder of Lundgaard & Tranberg
 13 December – Jens Fink-Jensen, poet, author, photographer, composer and architect

Deaths
 7 March – Johannes Gandil, athlete and footballer, competitor in athletics at the 1900 Summer Olympics, silver medallist in football at the 1908 Summer Olympics (born 1873)
 30 April – Morten Pedersen Porsild, botanist active in Greenland (born 1872)
 17 June – Leck Fischer, writer (born 1904)
 21 July – Ejnar Nielsen, painter and illustrator, central proponent of symbolist painting (born 1872)
 25 July – Estrid Hein, ophthalmologist and women's rights activist (born 1873)
 30 November – Viggo Wiehe, stage and film actor (born 1874)
 5 December – Christian Christensen, track and field athlete, competitor at the 1900 Summer Olympics (born 1876)

References

 
Denmark
Years of the 20th century in Denmark
1950s in Denmark
1956 in Europe